Saint Lucy (283–304) is Christian saint who died during the Diocletianic Persecution.

Saint Lucy may also refer to:

People
 Saint Lucy's Day, also known as "Saint Lucia's Day"
 Saints Lucy and Geminian, two Christian martyrs
 Saint Lucy Filippini, a Catholic saint
 Saint Lucy Yi Zhenmei, Chinese martyr

Other uses
 Saint Lucy, Barbados, the northernmost area in the country of Barbados
 Saint Lucy's Day, a Christian feast day observed on 13 December

See also 
 St. Lucy's Church (disambiguation)
 Saint Lucy Parish (disambiguation)
 Saint Lucia (disambiguation)
 Saint Lucie (disambiguation)
 Santa Lucia (disambiguation)
 Santa Luzia (disambiguation)